In the last two decades tens of thousands of Australian flying foxes have died during extreme heat events. Flying fox die-offs feature arguably among the most dramatic mass mortality events witnessed in nature, but they can be indicators of heat stress in more cryptic fauna where impacts are more difficult to assess. The die-offs are important additional threats to Australian flying-foxes and the ecosystem services they provide, and highlight the complex implications of climate change for behaviour, demography, and species survival.

Impacts on species
Two Australian flying fox species have reportedly been affected by extreme heat events: the grey-headed flying fox (Pteropus poliocephalus) and the black flying fox (P. alecto). Where mixed-species colonies are affected the black flying fox suffers substantially higher mortality than the grey-headed flying fox. However, summer temperatures are more extreme within the range of the grey-headed flying fox than within the range of the black flying-fox, and therefore the actual total number of casualties is much higher among grey-headed flying foxes than black flying foxes. On occasion, the federally endangered spectacled flying fox (Pteropus conspicillatus) may be affected as well, further threatening the species in Australia.

Impacts on demography
Mortality is especially high among dependent young and lactating females, but any demographic category can be affected.

Impacts on behaviour

Observations in flying fox colonies during extreme heat events have revealed that flying foxes go through a predictable sequence of thermoregulatory behaviours with rising temperatures:

 wing-fanning
 shade-seeking and clustering
 panting
 salivation

Beyond this, individuals tend to be found near the bases of trees where they form piles of lethargic and dead bats.

List of recorded Australian flying fox die-offs

References

External links

ARKive – images and movies of the grey-headed flying-fox (Pteropus poliocephalus)
Background: P. poliocephalus
Brief history of Megachiroptera / Megabats
 

Heat waves in Australia
Pteropus
2000s in Australia
2010s in Australia
Environmental issues in Australia